Care Bears: Adventures in Care-a-lot is an American animated television series produced by Sabella Dern Entertainment and American Greetings. The series, a follow-up to the movie Care Bears: Oopsy Does It!, was the third Care Bears television series, after the first version (produced by DIC Entertainment in 1985) and the second version (produced by Nelvana in 1986). The 2007 version features songs with music by Andy Street and lyrics by Judy Rothman.

The series aired on the CBSKEWLopolis programming block from September 15, 2007 to December 6, 2008. Along with the other shows in the KEWLopolis block, this series fulfilled the federal "E/I" requirements.

Summary
Unlike the previous animation created by DIC and Nelvana in the 1980s, and as with Care Bears: Oopsy Does It!, this series features the new redesigned Care Bears with redesigned tummy symbols (also called "belly badges"). It also features a redesigned Care-a-lot. Additionally, there was initially no interaction with humans or other supernatural entities like those found in the previous iteration. Instead, as an immediate follow-up to Care Bears: Oopsy Does It!, the series inherits the sole villain from the movie, Grizzle, who has robots to do his bidding.

While other Care Bears do make appearances in the show, the series primarily focuses on five Care Bears in particular as seen on the Care Bears website: Cheer Bear, the new leader of the group, Share Bear, who's now a horticulturist, Grumpy Bear, now an inventor, Funshine Bear, now an energetic fun bear instead of a jokester, and introduced in Care Bears: Oopsy Does It!, Oopsy Bear. The show's theme song is performed by Kay Hanley.

Characters

Main characters
Cheer Bear (voiced by Tabitha St. Germain) is optimistic, outgoing and intelligent. She is carnation pink with a rainbow as her tummy symbol and wears a rainbow-colored bow. She also seems to be the "doctor", as seen in the episodes "Care-Ful Bear", "Bubbles" and "King Grumpy".
Funshine Bear (voiced by Ian James Corlett)  he's determined and active. He often gets hooked on an idea and rarely lets go (as seen in the episodes "Care-ful Bear" and "Rainshine Meadows"). He is somewhat overconfident, which sometimes gets him into trouble. He has sunshine yellow fur with a sun as his tummy symbol and wears a red baseball cap.
Share Bear (voiced by Tracey Moore) has an innocent, naive, and airheaded demeanor. She is a horticulturist, often growing flowers in a garden she owns (along with a knowledge about them), and always carries a purse full of lollipops to share with her fellow Care Bear friends. She is lavender and has two lollipops crossed like an X as her belly badge.
Grumpy Bear (voiced by Scott McNeil) is cynical, bitter and fairly blunt, yet he is a prolific inventor by creating gizmos and gadgets intended to make a Care Bear's life easier, although some of his gadgets are absolutely nonsense (for example, he was working on a rainbow-powered windmill in the episode "All You Need Is..."). Whenever Oopsy makes accidents on him or his property, he utters phrases like, "Bumbling Blizterbugs!" and "Typhonic Typhoons!" He is sky blue and his belly badge is a rain cloud with raindrops shaped like hearts.
Oopsy Bear (voiced by Ashleigh Ball) is clumsy and accident-prone. He is light green and, unlike the other Care Bears, doesn't have a belly badge; he usually draws on his belly with a special belly badge crayon, often that of a shooting star, although he can erase it and change it according to his feelings (as seen in the Intro).

The villain
Grizzle (voiced by Mark Oliver) the main villain that resembles a brown Care Bear and wears a big metal suit. He hates the Care Bears because he doesn't understand what all of their caring is for, and wishes to take over Care-a-lot. He usually deploys robots or uses strange contraptions to carry out his dirty deeds, but it usually backfires on him. He exhibits megalomania, delusions of grandeur, and symptoms of mild schizophrenia, as he often seen talking to an inanimate bird made of spare parts named "Mr. Beaks" and replying to it as if it were speaking.

Supporting characters
Wingnut (voiced by Nathan Wallace) was originally built by Grizzle to function as an aide in Grizzle's Lair. However, by the end of the movie Oopsy Does It!, he has defected to the Care Bears' side. True to his name, a large Wingnut can be found on his head. He lives with Oopsy and is also usually found by Oopsy's side, if not occupied helping Grumpy out or playing with Funshine. Wingnut is equipped with Hammerspace storage to store various items that he or the other bears may need in the episode, such as pulling out a leafblower that's the same size as he is. He can also use the same compartment to analyze unknown substances.
Tenderheart Bear (voiced by Matt Hill), an excellent baseball player, is a bit of a daredevil. He is a good friend of Funshine. He has brown-orange fur, and has a red heart belly badge. He also wears a red heart-shaped backpack.
Harmony Bear (voiced by Andrea Libman) believes that, like the colors of the rainbow, many different people can come together to make something beautiful. She works at the SweetHeart SweetShop, and has a knack for creating outrageous new candies. Her fur color is violet and her belly badge is of a smiley-faced flower with different colored petals. She also wears a pink headband.
True Heart Bear (voiced by Stevie Vallance), the town's reporter and runner of the "Heroes of Care-a-Lot" website, she usually carries a laptop computer with wireless network connection and a digital camera around (seen in the episodes "Rainshine Meadows" and "Oopsy the Hero"). She is a pale pink bear and her belly badge is of a heart with triangle petal shapes around it. She tends to write in purple prose.
Wish Bear (voiced by Chiara Zanni) is very close to the Starbuddies and is shown to understand them more than the other bears, as has been shown in the episodes "Cheer, There and Everywhere" and "Twinklet", she has been with Grumpy in "Flower Power" and "Twinklet" She has her own Starbuddy pet, Twinkers. She can sometimes be shown with Grumpy Bear. She is a light turquoise bear and her belly badge is a shooting star. She also wears a yellow ribbon on her hair.
Bedtime Bear (voiced by Richard Ian Cox) is usually asleep when the other bears are up (waking up for only short moments to share his thoughts before drifting back to slumber during the day). However, he is fully awake at nighttime where he totes a lantern and functions as Care-a-Lot's night watchbear, making sure everyone is sleeping when they should (such as in the episodes "Belly Ball" and "Bubbles"). He is an aqua blue bear and his belly badge is a snoozing crescent moon with a small star. He also wears a purple & yellow night cap and white slippers.
Surprise Bear (voiced by Kelly Sheridan) loves and enjoys being surprised, such as in the episodes "Erased" and "Unbearable", or surprising the other bears, such as in the episodes "All You Need Is..." and "Gobblebugs". She often pops up in unexpected places. She is an amethyst purple bear and her belly badge is a star popping out of a jack-in-the-box.
Love-a-Lot Bear (voiced by Terri Hawkes) is a bear who works in the Smart Heart Library, where the other bears go if they have questions or if they needed some quiet time. She is a magenta pink bear and her belly badge is two intertwining hearts. She also wears a barrette in her hair that matches her belly badge and a purple scarf. When she speaks, she punctuates everything with the word "love" or a variation of such.
Good Luck Bear (voiced by Samuel Vincent) is yet another bear with no known job. However, he can be seen in the episodes "A Little Help" and "Tell Tale Tummy", where he helps the other bears prepare for the celebration. He is a shamrock green bear with a shamrock belly badge.
Amigo Bear (voiced by Samuel Vincent) is the ice-cream vendor in Care-a-Lot, providing refreshments at the meadows or near the gathering tree where the bears play. He is a red-orange bear with a tropical sun flower for his belly badge. True to his name, he speaks with a Hispanic accent and often uses Spanish words (meaning he can speak Latin Spanish).
Best Friend Bear works at the Grocery Store (as seen in the episode "Luck 'O Oopsy") and is a very helpful bear who believes friends are forever. She is an orchid bear and her belly badge is a heart and star connected by a rainbow.
Laugh-a-Lot Bear is a bear who loves making the others laugh. She is a dark orange bear and her belly badge is a smiling star with three pink hearts.
Friend Bear (voiced by Shannon Chan-Kent) is a yellow-orange bear with a flower in her hair and a belly badge showing two intertwining sunflowers. She appears in the episodes "Present and Accounted For", "Flower Power",  "Cheer, There, and Everywhere", and Stand Up and Cheer.
Champ Bear is a very sporty, royal blue bear with a trophy belly badge.
Baby Hugs is a light pink bear that lives with her brother Tugs at Cheer's house.
Baby Tugs is a light blue bear that lives with his sister Hugs at Cheer's house.
Bumpity voiced by Garry Chalk and Tweazle voiced by Shannon Chan-Kent are cloud like characters. They are known as the Nimbettes. They often try to help the Care Bears, but it usually goes wrong. Bumpity is big and sky blue and Tweazle is small and carnation pink. When she jumps in Wingnut's sugar sprinkler, she transforms into different shapes.
McKenna (voiced by Chantal Strand) is a human girl who learns lessons on caring in a few episodes of the second season.

Care-a-lot
The new Care-a-Lot has four main places that make it up:
Central Care-a-lot, basically the place where most of the show takes place, this hosts the Gathering tree and all of the houses, and Harmony's Sweet Shop.
Rainshine Meadows, Rainshine Meadows first appeared in the episode of the same name, where Funshine goes to Rainshine Meadows to practice his Belly Ball moves, and he finds it a mess. After a big storm the once beautiful place was ruined, but by the end of the episode, everything is cleaned up and the place is restored. If it appears in more episodes is unknown, due to the fact it looks a lot like the Meadow. Rainshine Meadows is accessed from behind the waterfall from the meadow where the bears usually play.
The Meadow, This is the place where the Care Bears often play together, pick flowers, go swimming (as seen in the episode "Erased"), etc. Rainshine Meadows, another meadow nearby, is accessed from a cave behind the waterfall.
Grizzle's Lair, A place where Grizzle lives above Care-a-lot and plots all of his evil plans.

Houses and buildings
The houses in Care-a-lot are very different, but they all show the personalities of their owners:
Oopsy's upside-down House: Oopsy's house resembles a building that had been flipped over, therefore the door is at the top, even with the decorative edging at the top that the other Care Bears have on the bottom of their houses. He lives to the right of Grumpy's Garage/Shop.
Cheer's House
Grumpy's Garage/Shop: The main part of Grumpy's house is the Garage/Shop where he does all of his work. The inside and outside of his house is blue and it is adorned with thunderbolts. Right above the door to his garage is a 2D flipped out umbrella. The inside of his Garage it holds his tools, a broom, a ladder, a work bench, etc. His house is to the right of Share's and to the Left of Oopsy's.
Share's Garden: Share's garden is her pride and joy and she keeps it very well. It is mostly full of Lollipop flowers that look like the Lollipops on her Belly Badge. Her house is to the Left of Grumpy's and the right of Funshine's.
Funshine's Fun-House: Funshine's many colored house has a yellow slide coming out of his bedroom window. Funshine's room in the Episode "Bubbles" only has a bed, but in the episode "Unbearable" it has a fireman's pole and a bedstand. His house is to the left of Share's.
Sweetheart Candy Parlor: Harmony Bear is seen running a candy parlor in the episode "Cheer, There and Everywhere/Twinklers") where she creates all manner of sweets. The name of the parlor was eventually revealed in the episode "Share And Share Alike".
Smart Heart Library: Love-a-Lot works at the library, but it is unclear if she's the head librarian or not. Commonly, the bears go to the library to find answers to questions they have (i.e. Funshine in the episode "Rainshine Meadows") or have some quiet time (i.e. Cheer and Harmony in Oopsy the Hero). This library is apparently named after Smart Heart Bear (who loves school and learning) but she has never appeared in this series.
Care-a-lot Cafe: Care-a-lot's local "cafe" has not been "announced" as a place in Care-a-lot yet, but it has been seen in the background. It is unclear of who works/owns the place. It is also possible that this place is an annexe of Sweetheart Candy Parlor.

Episodes

Theatrical pilot

Season 1

DVD-exclusive episodes

Season 2

Care Power Team movies

DVD release
In 2008, 20th Century Fox Home Entertainment released two DVDs of the series which contained double-length episodes from the second season which didn't air on TV at the time of release. "Grizzle-ly Adventures", released in February 2008 contained “Emma's Dilemma” and “Broken”; while "Ups and Downs", released in May 2008 contained “Cheer Up” and “Down to Earth”.

In 2009, Lionsgate Home Entertainment took over DVD distribution of the series under a new deal with American Greetings, and in March 2009, released their first DVD for the series titled "Cheer, There and Everywhere". The company would continue on to release DVDs of the series which all focus on specific morals.

Many of these releases have also been released on digital download.

References and footnotes

External links
 

2007 American television series debuts
2008 American television series endings
2000s American animated television series
American children's animated adventure television series
American children's animated education television series
American children's animated fantasy television series
CBS original programming
Adventures in Care-a-Lot
English-language television shows
Television shows based on Hasbro toys
Animated television series about bears